JBoss Operations Network (or JBoss ON or JON) is free software/open-source Java EE-based network management software. JBoss Operations Network is part of the JBoss Enterprise Middleware portfolio of software. JBoss ON is an administration and management platform for the development, testing, deployment, and monitoring of the application lifecycle. Because it is Java-based, the JBoss application server operates cross-platform: usable on any operating system that supports Java. JBoss ON was developed by JBoss, now a division of Red Hat.

Product features
JBoss ON provides performance, configuration, and inventory management in order to deploy, manage, and monitor the JBoss middleware portfolio, applications, and services.

JBoss ON provides management of the following:
 Discovery and inventory
 Configuration management
 Application deployment
 Perform and schedule actions on servers, applications and services
 Availability management
 Performance management
 Provisioning

JBoss ON is the downstream of RHQ (see also section Associated Acronyms).

Licensing & Pricing 
The various JBoss application platforms are open source, but Red Hat charges to provide a support subscription for JBoss Enterprise Middleware.

Associated acronyms 
Acronyms associated with JBoss ON:
 RHQ - upstream open source project of JBoss ON. Current stable version is RHQ 4.13; main difference between RHQ 4 and RHQ 3 is the transition of the UI framework to Google Web Toolkit.
 Jopr - previously the JBossAS management bits (upstream) of JBoss ON - now integrated into the RHQ source base (since September 2009). Jopr used to use RHQ as its upstream. There will be no more separate Jopr releases.
 JON - JBoss Operations Network (ON)

See also

 List of JBoss software
 Network monitoring system
 Comparison of network monitoring systems
 HyPerformix IPS Performance Optimizer
 IBM Tivoli Framework

References

Bibliography

External links
 JBoss application server website
  Securing JBoss
 JBoss Wiki
 JBoss Community Projects
 JBoss Introduction by Javid Jamae

Java enterprise platform
Red Hat software
Cross-platform software
Network management